The 2022 Nebraska Secretary of State election was held on November 8, 2022, to elect the Secretary of State of Nebraska. Incumbent Republican Bob Evnen won re-election to a second term unopposed. No Democratic candidates filed against him.

Republican primary

Candidates

Nominee
Bob Evnen, incumbent secretary of state

Eliminated in primary
Robert J. Borer, retired fire captain and first-ever recipient of the Congressional Public Safety Officer Medal of Valor
Rex Schroder, small business owner and retired fire chief

Endorsements

Primary results

General election

Predictions

References

Secretary of State
Nebraska
Nebraska Secretary of State elections